Changsha Mosque is a mosque located on Mount Huilong in Tianxin District of Changsha, Hunan, China. Changsha Mosque is the site of Changsha Islamic Association.

History
Changsha Mosque was first built by businessmen from both Henan and Shaanxi provinces in 1711 in the Qing dynasty with the name of "Kèsì".

In 1918, businessmen from Nanjing added Jingling School to the south of the mosque.

In 1938, a fire destroyed most of the buildings. Then the local Muslims rebuilt the mosque.

During the Cultural Revolution, the Quran written by ancient Imam were burned by the Red Guards.

In 1985, Changsha government had budgeted RMB 0.85 million yuan to built a new mosque on Mount Huilong in Tianxin District near Baisha Well.

Architecture

It consists of prayer hall, pavilion, wing room and other facilities. The prayer hall is a three-story building.

Transportation
 Take bus No. 314, 171, 139, 108 to Baisha Well Bus Stop.

References

1985 establishments in China
Mosques completed in 1985
Buildings and structures in Changsha